EDN may refer to:
 EDN (magazine), originally Electrical Design News
 Eden Park railway station, in London
 Endothelin
 Enterprise Municipal Airport (Alabama)
 Eosinophil-derived neurotoxin
 Europe of Nations, a political group in European Parliament
 Extensible Data Notation, a file format